The men's team road race at the 1956 Summer Olympics in Melbourne, Australia, was held on Friday 7 December 1956 as a part of the men's individual road race. The best three performances by nation were rewarded, with twenty teams competing.

Final classification

References

External links
 Official Report

Cycling at the Summer Olympics – Men's team road race
Road cycling at the 1956 Summer Olympics